The Kewaunee River is a  river in the U.S. state of Wisconsin.  It begins near Frog Station in northwest Kewaunee County and flows southeast to empty into Lake Michigan at the city of Kewaunee.

On a yearly basis, the Wisconsin Department of Natural Resources stocks approximately 72,000 Chinook salmon, 132,000 coho salmon, 102,000 steelhead and 54,000 brown trout into the Kewaunee River, hoping to imprint them to the river so that when they mature they return to it and will be captured for egg collection.

Gallery

See also
 C.D. "Buzz" Besadny Anadromous Fish Facility
 Ahnapee State Trail, runs partly along the Kewaunee River

References

Rivers of Wisconsin
Bodies of water of Kewaunee County, Wisconsin